Oscar Reginald Stewart (4 September 1878 – 17 January 1952) was an Australian rules footballer who played with St Kilda in the Victorian Football League (VFL).

Stewart kicked six goals from 13 appearances in the 1897 VFL season, which was enough to share the goal-kicking honours with teammate Bill Ahern. He played just twice the following year and finished his VFL career with no wins.

He had a brother, Ernest, who played some games with him at St Kilda in 1897.

References

1878 births
St Kilda Football Club players
Australian rules footballers from Melbourne
1952 deaths
People from Brighton, Victoria
People educated at Scotch College, Melbourne